Kek Look Seah Temple (also called as Kek Lok Seah Temple) is a Chinese temple located in Taman Happy of Ipoh, Perak, Malaysia. The temple is known for its planchette divination and has a medical room where Chinese medicine is given – which is not common for many Buddhist temple. This persistently making it being mistakenly referred to many people as a Dejiao establishment despite it is a Buddhist temple of Mahāyāna branch.

Kek Look Seah literally means "Sukhāvatī Society" in the Hokkien (Minnan) language.

History 
The temple was established in 1960 by a group of like minded Buddhists guided by planchette divination from the Buddhas, in a small terrace house with treatment service of traditional Chinese medicine to those who are in need especially to poor people.

Features 
The temple is one of the main Buddhist centre in local community. During Buddha's birthday (Wesak), the centre with the local supports who stay in the community will organise a great vegetarian feast in front of the altar for prayers before eaten by the attendees. The foods served are all in vegetarian as Buddhist teachings always encourage people to consume more vegetables. The temple also has crematorium services located far from the temple area in Bercham.

See also 
 Kek Lok Si, Penang, Malaysia: shares a similar name in Chinese

References

External links 
 

Religious buildings and structures completed in 1964
Chinese-Malaysian culture
Buddhist temples in Malaysia
Buildings and structures in Ipoh
Religious buildings and structures in Perak
Tourist attractions in Perak
20th-century Buddhist temples
20th-century architecture in Malaysia